Cypriot National Badminton Championships are held in Cyprus since 1990. The international championships already started 1987.

Winners

External links
Statistics
Cyprus Badminton

National badminton championships
Badminton tournaments in Cyprus
Badminton
Recurring sporting events established in 1990
1990 establishments in Cyprus